"In Between Dances" is a song written by Craig Bickhardt and Barry Alfonso, and recorded by American country music artist Pam Tillis. It was released in June 1995 as the fifth and final single from the album Sweetheart's Dance.  The song reached number 3 on the Billboard Hot Country Singles & Tracks chart.

Personnel
Compiled from liner notes.
 Mike Brignardello — bass guitar
 Paul Franklin — steel guitar
 Rob Hajacos — fiddle
 Brent Mason — electric guitar
 Steve Nathan — piano
 Pam Tillis — lead vocals, background vocals
 Biff Watson — acoustic guitar
 Lonnie Wilson — drums

Chart performance

Year-end charts

References

1995 singles
1994 songs
Pam Tillis songs
Songs written by Craig Bickhardt
Arista Nashville singles